Bishop Patrick Phelan DD (2 January 1856 – 5 January 1925) was Roman Catholic Bishop of Sale, Victoria, Australia.

Biography
Phelan was born on 2 January 1856, in Johnstown, Kilkenny, Ireland, to Martin and Margaret Phelan, and educated at Mount Melleray Seminary, and St. Patrick's College, Carlow. He was ordained a priest for Melbourne, Australia in 1888. Phelan was a founder and frequent contributor to Austral Light.

In 1900, he was appointed Dean of Melbourne, and served as Vicar-General from 1908 to 1913. On 2 November 1912, he was appointed Bishop of Sale, a position he held until his death on 5 January 1925, in a private hospital in Dublin, Ireland where he was receiving medical treatment.

He was noted for his administration, where he raised £25,000 over three years to build St Patrick's College in Sale, which opened in 1922, and when he died both the parish and college were debt-free. The Bishop Phelan Stadium, on the St Patrick's Campus of the Catholic College Sale, is named in his honour.

Phelan's brother Micheal became a Jesuit priest and also ministered in Australia.

References

1856 births
1925 deaths
Alumni of Carlow College
Contributors to the Catholic Encyclopedia